A drawbridge is a type of moveable bridge. In American English, drawbridge can also refer to moveable bridges in general.

Drawbridge may also refer to:

People
John Drawbridge, a 20th-century New Zealand artist

Geography
 Drawbridge, California, a ghost town in the USA
 Drawbridge, Cornwall, a hamlet in England
 Drawbridge Peak, a mountain in Alberta, Canada
 Kuala Terengganu Drawbridge, a bridge in Terengganu, Malaysia

Other uses
 Drawbridge (company), based in California, US
 The Drawbridge, a quarterly newspaper in London
 Drawbridge in Nieuw-Amsterdam, a painting (1883) by Vincent Van Gogh.
 Drawbridge mentality, a term describing a selfish mentality.